Wemme  is an unincorporated community in the northwest United States, located in Clackamas County, Oregon, east of Portland. It is located within the Mount Hood Corridor, between Welches and Brightwood along U.S. Route 26. It is one of the communities that make up the Villages at Mount Hood.

The community was named for E. Henry Wemme, a Portland businessman who bought a Locomobile in 1899, the first automobile in Oregon.  He also bought the right-of-way to Barlow Road in 1912, bequeathing it to the public after his death two years later.

West Coast Airlines Flight 956
It occurred on Saturday night, October 1, with eighteen fatalities and no survivors, and marked the first loss of a Douglas DC-9 aircraft.

See also 
 Mount Hood Village CDP
 Village (Oregon)

References

Portland metropolitan area
Unincorporated communities in Clackamas County, Oregon
Unincorporated communities in Oregon